The Secret Service Agent's Memories is a Russian historical television series based on the novel by Oleg Ryaskov, who is also the director.

Plot
A messenger of the Order of Masons visits Prince Menshikov with a plan to marry the heir to the throne to the daughter of a gray cardinal. At the same time, the prince is visited by a young officer, Ivan Samoilov. He receives the task, which, having shown ingenuity and courage, performs brilliantly. After that, the head of the Secret Chancellery  draws attention to the resourceful officer and, thanks to a deft intrigue, forces him to enter the service of his department. Now Ivan can expect dizzying adventures: hunting for a serial killer, investigating the death of an elderly nobleman in a house of tolerance, trying to figure out the intrigues of the ancestor of evil, etc.

Cast

 Sergey Chonishvili as Ushakov, head of Secret Chancellery 
 Anna Snatkina as Anastasia Vorontsova
 Pyotr Krasilov as Semyon Plakhov
 Ilya Sokolovsky as Ivan Samoilov
 Mikhail Politseymako as Henry Anroville
 Maksim Dakhnenko as  Van Hoover
 Andrei Ryklin as Prince Menshikov
 Aleksandr Tereshko as Joe Bucket, Captain of the Pirates
 Darya Melnikova as Fyokla
 Yekaterina Yudina as Ann Bonnie
 Sergey Serov as Duke Belozerov
 Elena Burlakova as Varvara Belozerova
 Olga Ajaja as Sofia Belozerova
 Aleksandr Starikov as Prince Tolstoi
 Yevgeny Radko as La Shanieau
 Anna Nosatova as Mary
 Andrei Bolsunov as French Ambassador
 Boris Kamorzin as Duke Firsanov
 Marina Mogilevskaya as Duchess Firsanova
 Alevtina Dobrynina as Madame Sophie
 Yuri Vasiliev as English Ambassador
 Roman Macedonsky as Peter II
 Yekaterina Rednikova as Maria Karlovna
 Yuriy Nazarov as Yakov Petrovich
 Vladimir Nikitin as  Count Orlov
 Anna Starshenbaum as Kat

The scenery

Season 2 was built on the scenery of the city in the 18th century.

Other titles of the series 

 Pakt des Bösen — Der Agent des Zaren (Germany)
 Pakt des Bösen 2 — Die Rückkehr (Germany)
 The secret service agent’s memories (USA)
 Memoirs of a Secret Agent (Europe)
 Нотатки експедитора Таємної канцелярії (Ukraine)
 ยอดสายลับประจัญบาน ปี (Thailand)
 Pastabos transportavimo Secret kanceliarijos (Lithuania)

References

External links

2010s Russian television series
2011 Russian television series debuts
Russian adventure television series